Kalkot Mataskelekele Mauliliu (born 24 April 1949) is a Vanuatuan politician who served as the president of Vanuatu from 16 August 2004 to 16 August 2009.

Biography 
He was educated at Scotch College, Melbourne the University of Papua New Guinea.  He is a lawyer from the national capital, Port Vila, and is the first Head of State of Vanuatu to have a university degree. Mataskelekele had previously served as Vanuatu's first indigenous Solicitor General and a former Supreme Court justice.

He was elected by the electoral college, which consists of the Parliament and regional Presidents, on 16 August 2004, and sworn in the same day.

He had previously been a candidate in the presidential election of April 2004, and was backed by the government of Edward Natapei. However, after several inconclusive rounds in the electoral college, he was defeated by Alfred Maseng. After the impeachment of Maseng and a parliamentary election, a new election was held on 12 August 2004, which was inconclusive and was continued on 16 August. Though Kalkot was widely expected to win, there were many other candidates, and he faced tough opposition from Willie David Saul and former Prime Minister Donald Kalpokas. In the final round of voting, Kalkot defeated Saul by a vote of 49 to 7.

References

External links
 President Mataskelekele's address to the 63rd session of the United Nations General Assembly, 26 September 2008
 Interview of Kalkot Mataskelekele by China Central Television, 10 August 2008

1949 births
Living people
Presidents of Vanuatu
Vanuatuan lawyers
People from Shefa Province
Vanuatuan judges
National United Party (Vanuatu) politicians
People educated at Scotch College, Melbourne
University of Papua New Guinea alumni
Members of the Parliament of Vanuatu